R v Kewelram is an important case in South African law. It was heard in the Appellate Division, Bloemfontein, on 15 February 1922, with judgment handed down on 6 March. The judges were Innes CJ, Solomon JA, Maasdorp JA, De Villiers JA and Juta JA.

Facts 
The appellant was convicted by a jury of arson on an indictment which charged him with setting fire to the store of one "M," with the intent to injure "M" in his property. The appellant was the occupant of the store, and his stock in it was insured against fire. The jury found, upon certain questions put to it by the presiding judge,

 that the appellant set fire to his stock with the object of defrauding the insurance company;
 that the fire damaged the building; and
 that the appellant must have known and realised that that would be the result.

Judgment 
Upon certain questions of law reserved, the Appellate Division held that, in order to support the indictment, it was not necessary for the Crown to establish the existence of a specific intention to injure "M" by proof of words or acts directly relating to him, but that such intention could be inferred from the unlawful intent with which the goods had been fired, coupled with the realisation of the fact that the burning of the stock would result in the burning of the building. The court held further that evidence as to the financial position of the accused prior to the fire, and as to his insurance of the stock contained in the store, had been properly admitted.

See also 
 Arson
 Crime in South Africa
 Evidence
 Intention (criminal law)
 Law of South Africa
 South African criminal law

References

Case law 
 R v Kewelram 1922 AD 213.

Notes 

Appellate Division (South Africa) cases
1922 in South African law
1922 in case law
Arson in Africa